The Slovak-Moravian Carpathians (CZ/SK: Slovensko-moravské Karpaty) are the mountain ranges along the border of the Czech Republic and Slovakia. Before the Treaty of Trianon in 1920, it was known in Hungarian as Magyar-morva határhegység 'the Hungarian-Moravian border mountains'.

Geologically these ranges are part of the Outer Western Carpathians group of the Western Carpathians, and are composed mainly of flysch sediment.

The Slovak-Moravian Carpathians consist of:

 White Carpathians (CZ: Bílé Karpaty, SK: Biele Karpaty), which encompasses the Biele Karpaty Protected Landscape Area within Slovakia and the Bílé Karpaty Protected Landscape Area in the Czech Republic
 Javorníky (CZ+SK; "Maple Mountains"), including the two highest points in these ranges, Veľký Javorník at 3,514 feet (1,071 metres) and Malý Javorník (1,021 metres)
 Myjava Hills (SK: Myjavská pahorkatina), rugged highlands along the Myjava River
 Váh Valley Land (SK: Považské podolie) along the Váh River
 Vizovice Highlands (CZ: Vizovická vrchovina), rugged highlands within the Zlín Region, including the highest peak, Klášťov

References

Mountain ranges of the Czech Republic
Mountain ranges of Slovakia
Mountain ranges of the Western Carpathians